Black Angel (Spanish: Ángel negro) is a 1978 action-thriller film written and directed by Tulio Demicheli. It was a co-production between Mexico and Spain. A man seeks revenge for the assassination of his father.

Cast

Carlos Bracho 
Sandra Mozarowsky 
Carlos Muñoz 
Mónica Randall 
Jorge Rivero

References

External links

Mexican action thriller films
Spanish action thriller films
1970s action thriller films
Films directed by Tulio Demicheli
1970s Spanish-language films
1970s Mexican films
Spanish films about revenge
1970s Spanish films